Lana Zaki Nusseibeh is an Emirati diplomat who serves as the United Arab Emirates Permanent Representative to the United Nations since September 2013.

Early life and education
Nusseibeh's father is presidential advisor and interpreter Zaki Nusseibeh, and her grandfather was Palestinian moderate Anwar Nusseibeh. She has bachelor's and master's degrees in history from Queens' College, University of Cambridge and a Master's in Israeli and Jewish Diaspora Studies from the School of Oriental and African Studies, University of London.

Career
Nusseibeh was a consultant for UNESCO in Paris from 2000 to 2001, and an analyst with the Security and Terrorism Programme of the Gulf Research Center from 2004 to 2006. She was head of the International Renewable Energy Agency taskforce before beginning work within the UAE Ministry of Foreign Affairs from 2009, first as Director of the Policy Planning Department and then as Special Envoy to Afghanistan and Pakistan. She was Deputy Sherpa for the UAE's participation in the G20 and a member of the UK-UAE Ministerial Taskforce.

Nusseibeh was appointed UAE Ambassador and Permanent Representative to the UN by President Khalifa bin Zayed Al Nahyan in September 2013, the first woman in the position. She was elected as one of the Vice Presidents for the 72nd session in 2017, representing the Asia-Pacific group of member states. She was formerly President of the UN Women Executive Board in 2017. She is also co-chair of the Friends of the Future of the UN. Nusseibeh is a member of the Board of Trustees of the Emirates Diplomatic Academy.

She was the UAE's Permanent Representative to the U.N. when the UAE abstained from condemning Russia on the UN Security Council over its invasion of Ukraine in February 2022. Nusseibeh said the vote was a "foregone conclusion."

Awards and honours
 UAE Prime Minister's Government Excellence Award (Medal of Pride)

Publications

References

Living people
Alumni of SOAS University of London
International Renewable Energy Agency people
Emirati women diplomats
Permanent Representatives of the United Arab Emirates to the United Nations
Lana Zaki
Year of birth missing (living people)
Alumni of Queens' College, Cambridge
United Arab Emirates women ambassadors